Ashley D. Bell is an American attorney, political advisor, and government official serving as Regional Administrator of the Small Business Administration for Region IV, which is in the Southeastern United States. In October 2019, it was announced that Bell would serve as a White House Policy Advisor for Entrepreneurship and Innovation in the Office of American Innovation.

Early life and education 
Bell was born and raised in Gainesville, Georgia. In 2001, Bell earned a Bachelor of Arts degree in political science from Valdosta State University, where he served as president of the Student Government Association and founded the local chapter of the Iota Phi Theta fraternity. He earned a Juris Doctor from Louisiana State University. He also attended Harvard University's John F. Kennedy School of Government where he was a 21st Century Leadership Fellow. He also has an honorary doctorate in Intercultural & Urban Studies from Lighthouse College.

Career

Legal career 
Bell began his career as a public defender, later co-founding the law firm of Bell & Washington LLP based in Atlanta. Bell initially focused on general civil litigation, later going on to concentrate on public finance and government litigation. Bell was named a 2017 Georgia "Super Lawyer Rising Star", one of the 2016 "Top 40 Young Lawyers" by the American Bar Association, a 2016 “Lawyer on the Rise” by Georgia's leading legal journal. After leaving the Trump Administration in 2020, Bell became a partner in Dentons' policy practice.

Political 
Bell was elected to the Hall County, Georgia County Commission at the age of 27. Previously a Democrat, Bell left the party to become a Republican in 2010. From 2011 to 2012, he was the senior surrogate for the Newt Gingrich 2012 presidential campaign. In 2012, he was appointed as a special advisor to Mitt Romney during the general election and co-chaired Blacks for Romney with U.S. Senator Tim Scott. In 2014, Bell was the senior surrogate for Jack Kingston's Senate campaign. He was also the national co-chair for the Rand Paul 2016 presidential campaign.

In 2016, Bell was appointed Senior Strategist and National Director of African-American Political Engagement for the Republican National Committee. in 2017, he joined the Trump Pence Presidential Transition Team, later serving as a Special Assistant in the Bureau of Public Affairs. On July 7, 2017, the United States Peace Corps announced Bell as the new Associate Director for External Affairs, overseeing Peace Corps’ Offices of Communications, Congressional Relations, Gifts and Grants Management, and Strategic Partnerships and Intergovernmental Affairs.

Bell was appointed on February 21, 2018 by President Donald Trump to serve as Regional Administrator for the U.S. Small Business Administration for Region IV; serving nine districts located in Alabama, Florida, Georgia, Kentucky, Mississippi, North Carolina, South Carolina, and Tennessee. Bell has oversight of over $5 billion in SBA-backed lending, the counseling arm of the SBA, which counseled over 225,000 entrepreneurs last year in Region IV, and the contracting programs for small business, which account for over 23% of all federal contracts awarded.

Non-profit and volunteer service 
Bell is the Founder and Chief Executive Officer of the 20/20 Bipartisan Justice Center, which purports to be the only nationwide coalition of Black Republicans, Democrats and Independents focused on criminal justice reform. He is also the Founder of Generation Inspiration, which describes its mission as being to teach life skills not taught in the classroom to at-risk students of color in Bell's hometown of Gainesville, Georgia, setting them on a trajectory for success.

References

African-American people in Georgia (U.S. state) politics
Valdosta State University alumni
Louisiana State University alumni
Small Business Administration personnel
African-American lawyers
People from Hall County, Georgia
Georgia (U.S. state) lawyers
Trump administration personnel
21st-century American lawyers
21st-century African-American women
21st-century African-American people
African-American women lawyers
Public defenders
Black conservatism in the United States